There are a number of cemeteries in Algiers. Among them is the Thaalibia Cemetery, the oldest one. A number of them have listed buildings or structures, or have been classified and registered as historic .

List

Gallery

See also
Lists of cemeteries
Ministry of Religious Affairs and Endowments
Algiers Province

Management of funerals and cemeteries of Algiers

References

External links

 
Cemeteries